Dominion Labour Party may refer to:
 Dominion Labor Party (Alberta)
 Dominion Labour Party (Manitoba)